John Howden (died c. 1406), of York, was an English Member of Parliament.
He was married, at some point by May 1368, to a woman named Juliana. She was possibly a daughter of John Archibald of York, and together they had possibly one son, and they had one daughter.

Howden was Mayor of York 3 February 1386–7. He was a Member (MP) of the Parliament of England for City of York in November 1384, February 1388, September 1391.

References

14th-century births
1400s deaths
14th-century English people
People from York
Lord Mayors of York
Members of the Parliament of England (pre-1707)
Year of birth unknown
Year of death uncertain